Federal Highway 185D(Carretera Federal) is a toll highway in the southern portion of Oaxaca. It serves as a bypass of the cities in the Istmo region and connects Salina Cruz to La Ventosa. The highway is maintained by Caminos y Puentes Federales, which charges 95 pesos per car to travel the full course of the route.

References 

Mexican Federal Highways